Just Patti was a Patti Page LP album, issued by Mercury Records as catalog number MG-25196 in 1954. Musical accompaniment was provided by Jack Rael's Orchestra.

Track listing

References

Patti Page albums
Mercury Records albums
1954 albums